Borja Pardo Calero (born 30 January 1979 in Madrid) is a 7-per-team football player from Spain.

He has a disability: he has cerebral palsy and is a CP6 type player.  He played 7-per-team football at the 1996 Summer Paralympics.  His team finished third after they played the United States and won 2–1.  He played 7-per-team football at the 2000 Summer Paralympics. His team finished 6th.

References

External links 
 
 

1979 births
Living people
Paralympic medalists in football 7-a-side
Paralympic bronze medalists for Spain
7-a-side footballers at the 1996 Summer Paralympics
7-a-side footballers at the 2000 Summer Paralympics
Medalists at the 1996 Summer Paralympics
Sportspeople from Madrid